2004 Empress's Cup Final was the 26th final of the Empress's Cup competition. The final was played at National Stadium in Tokyo on January 1, 2005. Nippon TV Beleza won the championship.

Overview
Nippon TV Beleza won their 6th title, by defeating Saitama Reinas FC 3–1 with Eriko Arakawa and Shinobu Ono goal.

Match details

See also
2004 Empress's Cup

References

Empress's Cup
2004 in Japanese women's football